Keuka is a Mexican brand engaged in the manufacture of sportswear, especially for football equipment.

Sponsorship
Keuka has sponsored several Mexican teams from first, second and third divisions, as well as teams from Chile, Colombia, Costa Rica and also meny national teams in his history.

National teams 
  (From June 2022)

Club teams 
 Santiago Morning
 Cortulua
 Puntarenas F.C.
 Celaya F.C.
 Cimarrones de Sonora
 Atlético Morelia
 Atlante F.C.
 Alacranes de Durango
 Gavilanes de Matamoros
 Tlaxcala F.C.
 Costa del Este F.C. (2015-2017)
 CSD San Miguelito (2016-)
 Atlético Veragüense (2017-2019)
 Sporting San Miguelito (2017-)

References

External links 
 Web site

Mexican brands
Sportswear brands
Clothing companies established in 2000
Sporting goods manufacturers of Mexico
Mexican companies established in 2000